Walsinghamiella prolai is a moth of the family Pterophoridae. It is known from South Africa, the Comoros and Madagascar.

References

Pterophorinae
Moths described in 1994